The Curtis Culwell Center attack was a failed terrorist attack on an exhibit featuring cartoon images of Muhammad at the Curtis Culwell Center in Garland, Texas on May 3, 2015, which ended in a shootout with police guarding the event, and the deaths of the two perpetrators. The attackers shot an unarmed Garland Independent School District (GISD) security officer in the ankle. Shortly after opening fire, both attackers were shot by an off-duty Garland police officer and killed by SWAT.

The FBI had been monitoring the two attackers for years, and an undercover agent was right behind them when the first shots were fired. The injured security guard filed a lawsuit against the FBI in October 2017, claiming the FBI was partially responsible for his injuries.

The Islamic State of Iraq and the Levant (ISIL) claimed responsibility for the attack plot, the first time the militant group took credit for an attack in the United States. ISIL's claim of responsibility was not verified, and U.S. officials stated that the attack appears to have been inspired, but not directed, by ISIL.

An online ISIL persona run by internet troll Joshua Ryne Goldberg had posted maps to the exhibition, and urged his followers to attack the event. Goldberg pleaded guilty to federal charges in December 2017. His persona was retweeted by one of the attackers on the morning of the attack, and Goldberg claimed responsibility for inciting the attack to multiple news outlets and in his plea agreement.

Background

Muhammad exhibit and contest

The event, which featured images of Muhammad, was advertised as the "First Annual Muhammad Art Exhibit and Contest", presented by the American Freedom Defense Initiative (AFDI), or Stop Islamization of America. It was organized by the AFDI together with the David Horowitz Freedom Center's Jihad Watch, run by Robert Spencer. A $10,000 award was offered for the winning cartoon, which was selected from among 350 submissions. The prize was awarded to Bosch Fawstin, a former Muslim and a critic of Islam who submitted six drawings, with the text "You can't draw me!"/"That's why I draw you." He was to collect an award of $12,500. Though images of Muhammad are not explicitly banned by the Quran, prominent Islamic views oppose human images, especially those of prophets. Such views have gained ground among certain militant Islamic groups.

The event featured speeches by Pamela Geller, president of the AFDI, and Dutch politician Geert Wilders, party leader of the Party for Freedom and outspoken critic of Islam. Congressmen Keith Ellison and André Carson had tried unsuccessfully to block Wilders from entering the United States. At the time of the attack, the "First Annual Muhammad Art Exhibit and Contest" exhibit was attended by approximately 150 people, although the number was initially estimated at 200.

The organizers of the event had paid over $10,000 to a total of forty off-duty police officers and private security guards. The Federal Bureau of Investigation (FBI), a SWAT team, the Bureau of Alcohol, Tobacco, Firearms and Explosives (ATF), and the Texas Department of Public Safety (DPS) were also brought in for the occasion of any possible incidents. At the time, there was reportedly "no immediate credible threat" of an attack.

Prior to the attack, ISIL had urged followers and sympathizers who were unable to join the fighting in the Syrian Civil War to carry out jihad in their home countries. Approximately three hours prior to the start of the contest, the FBI had alerted the Garland Police Department that a suspected extremist, identified as gunman Elton Simpson, was "interested in the event" and could show up there. However, FBI officials later clarified they had no reason to believe an actual attack would occur at the contest. Officers later stated that they were not aware of the alert.

Location
The "First Annual Muhammad Art Exhibit and Contest" event was hosted at the Curtis Culwell Center, rented from the Garland Independent School District. The center previously hosted a fundraiser in January called "Stand With the Prophet in Honor and Respect", which was organized to combat negative stereotypes of Islam. Geller had spearheaded about 1,000 picketers at that event.

Before the start of the "First Annual Muhammad Art Exhibit and Contest", concerns were expressed by Garland citizens about the center hosting the event due to potential backlash and retaliation, a sentiment that had also been voiced prior to the "Stand With the Prophet in Honor and Respect" event. However, officials allowed both events to proceed as planned, since the school district was bound by a nondiscriminatory leasing policy. Garland ISD board president Rick Lambert said in January, "The Culwell Center is available for rental as long as you comply with the law. Because it is a public facility, the district is not allowed to discriminate based upon viewpoint."

Attack
Minutes prior to the attack, a man, identified by police as one of the gunmen, posted a tweet with the hashtag #texasattack: "May Allah accept us as mujahideen." In his tweet, he said he and an accomplice had pledged allegiance to "Amirul Mu'mineen", which Paul Cruickshank of CNN said probably referred to ISIL leader Abu Bakr al-Baghdadi. The user also asked his readers to follow Junaid Hussain on Twitter. After the shooting occurred, Hussain tweeted: "Allahu Akbar!!!! 2 of our brothers just opened fire".

Just before the event was set to end at around 7:00p.m., two men wearing body armor and equipped with three rifles, three handguns, and 1,500 rounds of ammunition drove up to a police car that was parked next to a barricade erected in front of the center. Seated inside the police car were Officer Gregory Stevens of the Garland Police Department and an unarmed Garland ISD security guard. The two gunmen got out of their vehicle and fired dozens of rounds at the police car, shooting the Garland ISD security guard. The men were then shot and wounded by Stevens, and eventually killed by SWAT officers. The Garland ISD officer, identified as 58-year-old Bruce Joiner, was shot in the ankle. He was treated at a local hospital and confirmed to be released at 9:00 p.m.

Authorities were worried that the suspects' car could contain an incendiary device; as a precaution, several nearby businesses were evacuated. Bomb units from the Garland Police Department, the FBI, the Plano Police Department, and the Dallas/Fort Worth International Airport were called to the scene. Police cordoned off a large area and at least three helicopters circled overhead. An officer in SWAT gear took the stage toward the end of the event and told attendees that a shooting had occurred, stating that one officer and two suspects had been shot. It was later confirmed that there were no explosives inside the vehicle. After the attack, Phoenix police began searching the two assailants' apartment.

Perpetrators
Elton Simpson ( 1985 – May 3, 2015) and Nadir Hamid Soofi ( 1981 – May 3, 2015), roommates living in an apartment in Phoenix, Arizona, were the assailants in the attack. Simpson was convicted of making a false statement about terrorism in 2011, and followed hacker and pro-ISIL propagandist Junaid Hussain on Twitter. Simpson was an employee at a dentist's office, while Soofi was running a carpet cleaning business. A third man, Abdul Malik Abdul Kareem (born  1972), was responsible for housing Simpson and Soofi at his home, as well as supplying them with the firearms and ammunition used in the attack. According to an indictment, around June 2014, the three began conspiring to support ISIL and considered targeting a number of locations for terrorist attacks.

Elton Simpson

Simpson was born in Illinois and raised in suburban Westmont. He moved to Phoenix at a young age. He converted to Islam while attending Washington High School. His lawyer described him as "particularly devout" and "entrenched in Islam", but said he did not seem to be a threat to anyone. Simpson was a longtime worshiper at the Islamic Community Center of Phoenix, starting in approximately 2005, but according to the mosque's president, Usama Shami, he stopped showing up months prior to the attack. The mosque has been part of previous terrorism probes. He attended Yavapai College in Prescott, Arizona, playing basketball for the college there.

Simpson was the subject of an FBI investigation starting in 2006, during which he stated his intent to travel to Somalia and join fellow jihadists. He had ties to Hassan Abujihaad, a former United States Navy sailor arrested in Phoenix and convicted of terrorism-related charges. Abujihaad had been an occasional attendant of the Islamic Community Center of Phoenix.

In May 2009, Simpson told an FBI informant, "I'm telling you, man, we can make it to the battlefield. It's time to roll." He was also recorded saying, "If you get shot, or you get killed, it's [heaven] straightaway... That's what we here for ... so why not take that route?" In 2010, one day before Simpson was scheduled to travel to Somalia, he was arrested by federal agents as the result of a four-year investigation. The Islamic Community Center of Phoenix posted cash bond of $100,000 to have him released from custody. Simpson was found guilty of making a false statement regarding international and domestic terrorism, and was sentenced to three years probation and a $600 fine in August 2011 after lying to a federal agent about his travel plans. His lenient sentence was the result of U.S. District Court Judge Mary H. Murguia not finding sufficient evidence to conclude that he planned to join a terrorist organization. He was put on the U.S. federal No Fly List. He had previously intended to travel with others to Syria to fight with ISIL, though his accomplices were arrested during simultaneous FBI raids in San Diego and Minneapolis. Authorities had already opened an investigation of Simpson at the time of the attack.

He also interacted with Junaid Hussain, a British-born hacker and member of ISIL, and Mujahid Miski, an Al-Shabaab recruiter and propagandist of Muslim extremism from Minnesota, via Twitter through "secure communication". Hussain was also the founder of a pro-ISIL hacker group called "CyberCaliphate", which was responsible for a cyber-attack on the United States Central Command's Twitter account in January 2015. A week prior to the attack, Simpson mentioned the "First Annual Muhammad Art Exhibit and Contest" event in a tweet sent to what is believed to be Hassan's Twitter account. Simpson then asked, "When will they ever learn?", and Hassan responded: "The brothers from the Charlie Hebdo attack did their part. It's time for brothers in the #US to do their part." Investigators believe Hussain and Hassan encouraged Simpson to commit an attack on U.S. soil, but also that Simpson assembled the attack plan and targeted the art exhibit on his own accord.

Simpson was identified as the same user who posted a tweet with the hashtag #texasattack: "May Allah accept us as mujahideen." The profile photo on #texasattack was of the late American Salafi imam Anwar al-Awlaki, who had repeatedly called for violence against cartoonists who insulted the Islamic prophet Muhammad prior to being killed in a U.S. drone strike in 2011 in Yemen. Junaid Hussain was identified as the ISIL propagandist whom Simpson recommended his readers to follow in that same tweet.

Nadir Soofi
Soofi's father, Azam Soofi, is Pakistani, and his mother, Sharon Soofi, is American. According to his mother, he was born at Presbyterian Hospital of Dallas and lived in Garland until age three. The family then moved to Plano, Texas, and then Alabama. His mother, who was raised Catholic, converted to Islam at the request of his father. Soofi was also raised as a Muslim by his father. He and his brother moved to Pakistan with their father and stepmother after their parents were divorced in the 1990s. During his time there, Soofi attended the International School of Islamabad, where he was said by friends to have been popular among his classmates.

In 1998, after living in Pakistan for six years, Soofi moved back to the U.S. to live with his mother in Utah. The two later moved to Phoenix in the mid-2000s. According to his friends in Pakistan, he had difficulties adjusting to the American culture upon moving to the U.S. He took a pre-medical course at the University of Utah starting in the fall semester of 1998, but dropped out in the summer of 2003. At one point, he also owned Cleopatra Bistro Pizza, a pizza and hot wings eatery that served halal food, though the business struggled and eventually closed down five months prior to the attack.

Soofi was arrested and charged for more than twenty minor offenses, most of them traffic violations. In June 2001, when he was twenty, he pleaded guilty to possession of alcohol by a minor. In March 2002, he pleaded guilty to alcohol-related reckless driving, followed by another guilty plea in June 2002 for driving on a suspended license. In 2003, he was charged for distributing a controlled substance and possessing drug paraphernalia, although the case was later dismissed. That same year in July, Soofi pleaded guilty to a misdemeanor assault charge. The case was also dismissed.

He was survived by his parents and an eight-year-old son from a failed marriage. After the attack, his mother said her son was "brainwashed" by Simpson, claims that were echoed by his father and maternal grandmother, and that she did not blame police for killing her son.

Abdul Malik Abdul Kareem

Abdul Kareem was born and raised in Philadelphia as Decarus Lowell Thomas. In 2013, he changed his name to Abdul Malik Abdul Kareem and converted to Islam. He occasionally attended the Islamic Community Center of Phoenix since at least 2011 and cleaned carpets there. Kareem had a criminal record in Arizona, including two aggravated drunken driving convictions and an aggravated assault charge in 1997. In the latter incident, a woman told police that he pointed a gun in her direction; Abdul Kareem claimed he instead took the weapon away from his brother during an argument and wasn't pointing it at anyone. He had been arrested a total of eleven times between 1991 and 2004, and also served jail time twice.

Following the attack, he lied to FBI investigators several times and said he was not asked by Simpson or Soofi to directly participate in the attack. However, according to a confidential informant, Kareem was indeed planning on participating with them and had been angry at the informant for not selling him suppressors and bulletproof vests. He allegedly attempted to fund the attack by feigning injuries inflicted after being struck by a car and then making an insurance claim based on the injuries. Previously, Abdul Kareem was investigated by the FBI in 2012 for having a terrorism training document on his computer and developing a plot to attack the Super Bowl XLIX game in Glendale, Arizona with pipe bombs. He had also reportedly accessed a list released by ISIL, which contained the names and addresses of U.S. service members.

He was arrested on June 11 and charged with "conspiracy, making false statements and interstate transportation of firearms with intent to commit a felony." According to an indictment, Kareem practiced shooting with Simpson and Soofi between January and May in Phoenix. According to CNN, the firearms were all bought legally. His trial was initially set for August 4, but it was later rescheduled for October 6. On December 21, Abdul Kareem was also charged with conspiring to provide support to ISIL and attempting to attack the Super Bowl XLIX game. On March 17, 2016, Kareem was found guilty of conspiring with terrorists for helping the attack's perpetrators plan to carry it out. He was sentenced to 30 years in prison in February 2017. Kareem is serving his sentence at FCI Beaumont Medium, and is scheduled for release on November 20, 2041.

ISIL claim of responsibility
In addition to the gunman's tweet pledging allegiance to ISIL, the jihadist group claimed responsibility for the attack, stating on its Al Bayan radio station that "two soldiers of the Caliphate executed an attack on an art exhibit in Garland, Texas.... This exhibit was portraying negative pictures of the Prophet Mohammed." It marked the first time ISIL took credit for an attack in the mainland U.S. ISIL promised to launch further attacks in the future. There was initially no evidence that ISIL had contact with the perpetrators, and law enforcement groups continued to investigate a possible link. Some counterterrorism experts expressed doubts on the legitimacy of those claims, noting that ISIL has in the past claimed responsibility for attacks they actually had no involvement in. One U.S. official said the attack was "certainly more than just inspiration" by ISIL. A law enforcement official said the attack did "not appear to be a clear-cut case of a lone wolf, nor a pure case of someone directed by others to act"; instead, "it appears to be something in between the two extremes". According to Defense Secretary Ashton Carter, the shooting was inspired, but not directed, by ISIL.

In August 2015, Centcom announced that it had killed Junaid Hussain in a drone strike in Syria, due to his influence in motivating lone wolf-style attacks. U.S. officials reportedly had a strong desire to assassinate Hussain, listing him as the third-highest ISIL target on the Pentagon's "kill list" behind Abu Bakr al-Baghdadi and Mohammed Emwazi.

In December 2017, a Florida Jewish American internet troll, Joshua Ryne Goldberg, was convicted of planning the bombing of a 2015 9/11 memorial event in Kansas City. In his communications with an FBI informant, Goldberg claimed credit for inspiring the Garland attack. Goldberg's fake Twitter persona using the name "Australi Witness" had posted a map of the Curtis Culwell Center and urged any in the area to attack "with your weapons, bombs, or knives". News reports about Goldberg's online persona calling for the Garland attack first brought Goldberg to the attention of the FBI. The FBI also found that Elton Simpson retweeted a message from Goldberg's Twitter handle on the morning of the attack.

Reactions and aftermath
Following the attack, Governor Greg Abbott released a statement, calling the attack "senseless" and promising there was an investigation underway. He also issued his gratitude to the Garland police officers for their swift action against the assailants. U.S. Secretary of Homeland Security Jeh Johnson said:

[The attack] serves as a reminder that free and protected speech, no matter how offensive to some, never justifies violence of any sort. This attack also underscores the importance of close collaboration between federal, state and local authorities in our Nation's homeland security efforts, as well as public awareness and vigilance.

Johnson urged American citizens to not "misdirect" their anger at Muslims. Texas Republican Senator John Cornyn said the contest was an expression of free speech. U.N. Secretary-General Ban Ki-moon also condemned the attack in a statement.

Muslim organizations also reacted to the attack. The Council on American–Islamic Relations issued a statement condemning the attack and saying, "Bigoted speech can never be an excuse for violence." Dr. Nasim Rehmatullah, National Vice President of the U.S. chapter of the Ahmadiyya Muslim Community, also said in a statement:

Violence is never an acceptable response to hate speech, no matter how inflammatory and uncivilized that speech is. While we do not yet know what motivated these shooters, we urge calm and defer to local, state, and federal authorities to peaceably and justly resolve this.

Following the attack, ISIL supporters expressed their support online with postings on ISIL-affiliated websites. Bosch Fawstin, the winner of the cartoon contest, has received numerous death threats. The Southern Poverty Law Center plans to discuss the incident in its 2016 report on hate in the United States. In the wake of the attack, the Garland Independent School District announced it would begin reviewing its policy for hosting events at the Curtis Culwell Center.

On May 29, 2015, protesters staging a "Freedom of Speech" rally outside of the Islamic Community Center of Phoenix, the same mosque where Simpson and Soofi had attended, were met with counter-protests. Jon Ritzheimer, a former U.S. Marine, organized the protest to take place during Friday evening prayers as a "response to the recent attacks in Texas."

On June 2, 2015, Boston police killed a Roslindale man armed with a military-style knife after the man charged at the officers. The man had planned to assassinate Geller because of the contest, but became impatient and decided to target local police instead.

In an interview with CNN, Geller denied that the event was intentionally provocative, criticized the media for not defending the First Amendment, and pointed out that other religions have been similarly offended but do not react violently. Geller later told CNN that the shooting would not stop her and the AFDI from organizing similar events in the future. She said regarding the attack, "Freedom of speech is under violent assault here." She also said that the shooting showed how "needed our event really was."

The Chicago Tribune reported on August 1 that Soofi, despite his long rap sheet, purchased a 9mm gun in 2010 at Lone Wolf Trading Co., one of the private companies encouraged by the Bureau of Alcohol, Tobacco, Firearms and Explosives (ATF) to sell weapons to persons who normally would not be legally allowed such purchases, an action that would later become the ATF gunwalking scandal. The Tribune wrote that Soofi's purchase was initially put on a seven-day hold but that "for reasons that remain unclear, the hold was lifted after 24 hours, and Soofi got the 9-millimeter." The day after the attack, the U.S. Department of Justice sent an urgent firearms disposition request to Lone Wolf Trading Co. As of the date of the Tribunes report, the FBI has not released any details of the guns used by Simpson and Soofi.

Lawsuit against the FBI 
The injured security guard, Bruce Joiner, filed a federal lawsuit in October 2017 against the FBI and DOJ.  His suit argues the bureau "solicited, encouraged, directed and aided members of ISIS in planning and carrying out the May 3 attack", and is asking for just over $8 million damages. Evidence submitted to court in previous cases confirm that an FBI undercover agent was in communication with the attackers and present at the Culwell Center during the attack. When he saw the attack underway he attempted to flee and was promptly stopped at gunpoint by Garland police.

Court pleadings filed by the federal government in January 2018 as part of an attempt to get the suit dismissed confirmed that the undercover FBI agent "was dressed in Middle Eastern attire and police almost killed him, but he saved his life by claiming to be an FBI agent." In a media interview, Joiner's attorney argued the attack was either "Just a complete botched operation where they [the FBI] don't want the attack to actually take place" or it was allowed to proceed in order to "bolster [the undercover agent's] street cred within ISIS". In March 2018, the undercover agent, appearing in disguise and under a pseudonym, testified in a criminal trial against Erick Jamal Hendricks. In that testimony the agent said he had no advance knowledge of the Garland attack and was surprised when the attackers opened fire.

On December 21, 2018, US District Court Judge Karen Gren Scholer dismissed Joiner's lawsuit. In her opinion, Judge Scholer wrote: "The Court finds that the conduct alleged by Plaintiff fall[s] within the scope of the discretionary authority conferred on the FBI by the Undercover Guidelines and the [DIOG (Domestic Investigations and Operations Guide)]."

Support and criticism of event

Support for Geller and AFDI
In an interview with Fox News Channel's The Kelly File, UCLA School of Law professor Eugene Volokh said

[T]his kind of discussion has value in debate about Islam and about the role of Islam and about the reaction of some Muslims, fortunately only a small portion of Muslims do these kinds of things. But beyond that it has value as a reaffirmation of our free speech rights. It has value as an act of defiance. It has value as people saying: look, we are not going to be shut up. When you tell us that we cannot draw pictures of Mohammed, when you tell us we cannot say these things or else you'll kill us, that just means that we're going to do it again and again to show that you cannot threaten Americans into submission.

Also on The Kelly File, Alan Dershowitz said that "critics of Pamela Geller...should realize that while she may have intended to provoke a negative reaction from extreme Islamists, she shares something in common with civil rights leader the Rev. Martin Luther King Jr."

Victor Davis Hanson wrote in an article in the National Review online magazine that "radical Islam has already cut a huge swathe out of American free speech through more than a decade of death threats." He also wrote that the criticism directed towards Geller for supposedly striking up religious hatred was "scary" and compared Geller to the cartoonists who were killed during the Charlie Hebdo shooting.

Bret Stephens, columnist for The Wall Street Journal, put Geller's speech in the same category as Bill Maher or the writers of Charlie Hebdo — legitimate speech against Islamism — and commented, "I say Islamist because there is a rich history of Muslim depictions of Muhammad." He also added that "those [who] blame Geller for the provocation are blaming the victim just as those who say rape victims are asking for it." Stephens went on to argue that a "society that rejects the notion of a heckler's veto cannot accept the idea of a murderer's veto..."

Rich Lowry, writing in Politico, defended Geller's idea that the contest and exhibit's purpose was about freedom of speech:

Respectable opinion can't bear the idea that she has become a symbol of free speech, which once upon a time was — and still is, when convenient — one of the highest values of the media and the left. If Geller were a groundbreaking pornographer like the loathsome Larry Flynt, someone would already be planning a celebratory biopic of her life. If she were a gadfly sticking it to a major Western religion rather than to Islam, she might be considered more socially acceptable.

Criticism of Geller and AFDI
On the day after the shooting, Donald Trump, appearing on Fox & Friends, questioned Geller's motives. He said, "It looks like she's just taunting everybody. What is she doing? Drawing Mohammed and it looks like she's actually taunting people. (...) You know, I'm one that believes in free speech, probably more than she does. But what's the purpose of this?" In response to Trump's remarks, Bill O'Reilly said in his program The O'Reilly Factor, "Mr. Trump is correct. By setting up a contest and awarding $10,000 for a depiction of the Prophet Mohammed, the American Freedom Defense Initiative spurred a violent attack. (...) Insulting a religion with more than a billion followers does not advance the cause of defeating the fanatical jihadists. It hurts the cause."

Fox News' On the Record host Greta Van Susteren criticized Geller for putting police officers' lives in danger. She said, "It's one thing for someone to stand up for the First Amendment and put his own you-know-what on the line, but here, those insisting they were defending the First Amendment were knowingly putting officers' lives on the line — the police."

Geller and Islamist Anjem Choudary appeared on Hannity on Fox News to debate the merits of AFDI's contest. In response to host Sean Hannity's question about whether Choudary supported an unverified ISIL fatwa and posted on an anonymous message board calling for Geller's death, he replied, "This isn't Mickey Mouse or Donald Duck they were drawing. This is the prophet. This woman wants to have people draw cartoons that insult the prophet knowing full well that carries the death penalty in Islam. So definitely, she's asking people to attack." When Hannity asked whether he thought Geller should die, Choudary said, "She should be tried in a sharia court, be found guilty, and, of course, she would face capital punishment." After Hannity reminded Choudary that Geller is not a Muslim, he continued, "You can't go down that road, insulting Muslims, and think the Muslims aren't going to retaliate back. I would attack someone if they insult my mother, let alone the prophet who I love 100 times more."

Garland Mayor Douglas Athas said he wished Geller had not chosen his town for her event and explained, "Her actions put my police officers, my citizens and others at risk. Her program invited an incendiary reaction. She picked my community, which does not support in any shape, passion or form, her ideology. (...) But at the end of the day, we did our jobs, we protected her freedoms and her life".

In an interview with The New York Times, the editor of Charlie Hebdo, Gérard Biard, rejected "attempts by right-wing activists to exploit that attack for their own agendas". He also added, "We have nothing to do with Pamela Geller's work. When Islam or the Prophet Muhammad jump out of the news, we comment on it, we mock it, maybe. But we are not obsessed about it."

See also
 2015 Copenhagen shootings
 Charlie Hebdo shooting
 List of terrorist incidents, 2015
 Everybody Draw Mohammed Day
 Jyllands-Posten Muhammad cartoons controversy
 List of Islamist terrorist attacks

Notes

References

2015 in Texas
Non-fatal shootings
Attacks on buildings and structures in the United States
Attacks in the United States in 2015
Counter-jihad
Crimes in Texas
Deaths by firearm in Texas
Defensive gun use
Cultural depictions of Muhammad
Failed terrorist attempts in the United States
Criminal duos
Freedom of speech in the United States
Garland, Texas
ISIL terrorist incidents in the United States
Islamic terrorism in Texas
Islamic terrorism in the United States
May 2015 crimes in the United States
May 2015 events in the United States
People shot dead by law enforcement officers in the United States
Terrorist incidents in the United States in 2015